Yani Gellman (born September 2, 1985) is a Canadian film and television actor, known for playing Paolo Valisari in The Lizzie McGuire Movie, Garrett Reynolds in Pretty Little Liars and Diego Flores in 90210.

Early life
Gellman was born in Miami, Florida, to a Canadian father and an Australian mother. He is of Jewish Russian, English, and Spanish descent. He was named after a family friend, writer Jan Yoors. His father was a reporter, and the family frequently moved during Gellman's childhood, living in Australia, Spain, and Texas before settling in Toronto. Gellman speaks Spanish, having learned it during his time living in Spain. He has a university degree in political science.

Career
Gellman's acting debut was in a 1998 episode of the television series, Animorphs. After appearing in several more television productions, he was cast in supporting roles in the 2000 film, Urban Legends: Final Cut and in 2001's Jason X. In both films, his characters eventually became victims of serial killers. He appeared in 2002's The Matthew Shepard Story as Pablo, the love interest of the title character.  Gellman became known among teenage audiences after playing the part of Paolo Valisari, an Italian pop singer and the  main antagonist of 2003's The Lizzie McGuire Movie.

He has been cast in the Canadian series Monster Warriors. From 2008 to 2012 he played Rafe Torres in the long-running soap opera, The Young and the Restless. Gellman has also appeared as a model in numerous print ads, including Omega watches. He made a cameo in Degrassi Goes Hollywood, as well as playing Pete in multiple episodes of "Greek". He has recently played the role of police officer, Garrett Reynolds in hit TV show Pretty Little Liars. He has also starred as Diego in the hit TV show 90210.

In 2017, Gellman appeared in the underwater survival thriller film 47 Meters Down which was released in theaters on 16 June 2017.

Filmography

Film

Television

Web

References

External links
 
 "The Young and the Sexless", interview in Out Magazine

1985 births
Canadian male film actors
Canadian male television actors
Canadian people of Australian descent
Canadian people of English descent
Canadian people of Jewish descent
Canadian people of Russian descent
Canadian people of Spanish descent
Canadian political scientists
Jewish Canadian male actors
Living people
Male actors from Toronto
People from Miami